Mitchell is a rural town and locality in the Maranoa Region, Queensland, Australia. The town services the local area, a cattle and sheep farming district.

Geography 

The Warrego Highway passes through town to form the main street, Cambridge Street. The Maranoa River flows around the northern and eastern sides of the town before eventually flowing into the Balonne River.

The Western railway passes through the locality, entering from the east (Amby / Walhallow) and exiting to the west (Womalilla). The locality is served by a number of railway stations, from west to east:

 Mitchell railway station, a passenger stop in the town
 Booringa railway siding, now dismantled
 Marbango railway station, now abandoned
Mitchell Airstrip is west of the town. Its IATA airport code is MTQ and its ICAO airport code is YMIT. It is operated by the Maranoa Regional Council and is suitable for light aircraft.

History 

Before the arrival of Europeans, the Maranoa region was occupied by the Mandandanji and Gunggari Aboriginal peoples. Based on archaeological excavations in the Mount Moffatt area, it has been deduced that the Aboriginals had lived there for around 19,500 years. Descendants of the original peoples still live in and visit the area today.

Mandandanji (also known as Mandandanyi, Mandandanjdji, Kogai) is an Australian Aboriginal language spoken by the Mandandanji people. The Mandandanji language region includes the landscape within the local government boundaries of the Maranoa Regional Council, particularly Roma, Yuleba and Surat, then east towards Chinchilla and south-west towards Mitchell and St George.

The town is named after Sir Thomas Mitchell explorer and Surveyor General of New South Wales, who explored the area in 1846.

In 1854, Edmund Morey established the property of Mitchell Downs. When the original homestead was largely destroyed by a flood in 1864, Thomas Close acquired the building's ruins and established the Maranoa Hotel.

On 1 January 1865, Mitchell Downs Post Office opened and around 1878 was renamed Mitchell Post Office.

Mitchell State School opened on 1 April 1876 as a primary school. In 1961, it was expanded to include a secondary school.

The first St Columba's Catholic Church was officially opened and blessed by Bishop Robert Dunne on Saturday 15 November 1884. On Sunday 24 April 1938, the new St Columba's Catholic Church was officially opened and blessed by Monsignor McKenna of Toowoomba. It was designed by J.P. Donoghue. The timber church was built by contractor F.T. Woollam at a cost of £3000. It can seat 350 people.

The foundation block for the first All Saints' Anglican Church in Mitchell was laid by Coadjutor Bishop Nathaniel Dawes on Wednesday 13 November 1889. The church was officially opened on Tuesday 5 August 1890 by Bishop William Webber. It was designed by architect John H. Buckeridge. It was built from cypress pine by Roma contractors, Allen Clell & Sons, at a cost of £274. The current All Saints' Anglican Church was built in 1965. It was designed by Ford Hutton, Newell, Black, and Paulson. This brick church can seat 110 people.

A Wesleyan Methodist Church was opened in Mitchell in April 1894. It could seat 80 people. It was built from timber at a cost of £200. Following the amalgamations of various denominations, it later became Mitchell Methodist Church and then Mitchell Uniting Church. It was at 82 Mary Street. It has closed and been converted into a house.

In 1902, after a short stand-off, bushrangers Patrick and James Kenniff were captured south of Mitchell at a location previously known as Back Creek but now known as Arrest Creek. Patrick was hanged in 1903 for the murder of Constable George Doyle (who had previously served at Wyandra) and Albert Dahlke, while James was released after 12 years imprisonment and died peacefully in 1940.

Long Gully Provisional School opened on 1915 on the road from Mitchell to St George; it closed in 1918.

St Patrick's Catholic Primary School opened on 4 November 1923.

Mitchell Aboriginal Provisional School opened on 1 May 1935 and was later proclaimed Mitchell Aboriginal State School. It closed on 19 November 1948.

At the 2006 census, Mitchell had a population of 944.

Mitchell was once the administrative centre of the Shire of Booringa local government area. Since 2008, the town is now part of the Maranoa Region.

In the March 2010 floods, the Maranoa River reached a peak of 13.4 m in the town causing an inundation of 25 houses. The town experienced the worst flooding ever in 2012 when a monsoon trough hovered over central and southern Queensland and nearly inundated Charleville,  to the west. .

Heritage listings

Mitchell has a number of heritage-listed sites, including:
 Mitchell War Memorial, Cambridge Street
 Mitchell State School (1914 Building), 105 Cambridge Street
 Mitchell railway station: Oxford Street (passenger station), Alice Street (goods shed used by Watco Australia and Aurizon) and Sheffield Street (station master's)

Amenities

Mitchell is home to the Booringa Heritage Museum housed in the old Council workshop building.

The Maranoa Regional Council operates a public library and the Maranoa Art Gallery at the old Maranoa Theatre building in Cambridge Street. From here it provides public WiFi by way of a high speed ISDN Internet Connection (powered through the National Broadband Network) to Brisbane.

St Columba's Catholic Church is at 86 Alice Street.

All Saints' Anglican Church is at 118 Alice Street.

The Mitchell branch of the Queensland Country Women's Association has its rooms at 87 Cambridge Street.

Education 
Mitchell State School is a government primary and secondary (Prep-10) school for boys and girls at 105 Cambridge Street. In 2017, the school had an enrolment of 132 students with 16 teachers (13 full-time equivalent) and 15 non-teaching staff (10 full-time equivalent).  In 2018, the school had an enrolment of 137 students with 15 teachers (13 full-time equivalent) and 14 non-teaching staff (10 full-time equivalent). Students come from Mitchell, Mungallala, Amby and surrounding properties. Students in Years 11 and 12 are taken by bus to Roma State College in Roma.

St Patrick's Primary School is a Catholic primary (Prep-6) school for boys and girls at 100 Alice Street. In 2017, the school had an enrolment of 37 students with 2 teachers and 6 non-teaching staff. In 2018, the school had an enrolment of 32 students with 4 teachers (3 full-time equivalent) and 5 non-teaching staff (3 full-time equivalent).

A major language revival effort has been under way in Queensland schools since St Patrick's School started teaching the Gunggari language around 2013. Since then, Mitchell State School has also started teaching Gunggari.

Facilities 

Facilities in Mitchell include:

 Mitchell Police Station
 Mitchell Fire Station
 Mitchell SES Facility
 Mitchell Multipurpose Health Service, a public hospital
 Mitchell Ambulance Station
 Mitchell Monumental Cemetery
 Mitchell Water Treatment Plant

The water supply for the town comes from three bores. The depth of the bores is about 1,000 metres. The water is pumped into a large concrete water tower on the western side of the town. The water is hot when it emerges from the ground, and in the tank it is about 50 °C. Houses close to the tank, have free hot water. In fact it is necessary to cool the water before it can be used.

Media 
Mitchell is serviced by the following radio stations - based in other locations, broadcast via local transmitters:

 Radio 4ZR (Resonate Radio Network) - 104.5 FM
 ABC Local Radio - 106.1 FM
 ABC Radio National - 107.7 FM
 Vision FM - 88.0 FM

Television services are provided by the Australian Broadcasting Corporation, with channels ABC, ABC Kids/ABC TV Plus, ABC ME and ABC NEWS, transmitting to Mitchell through its relay station, ABMLQ, situated at 26°32′35″S 148°6′41″E (Mitchell Escarpment)

The Seven Network and its sister stations 7Two and 7Mate transmit to Mitchell through its regional affiliate, ITQ

Network Ten and its sister channels 10 Bold and 10 Peach transmit to Mitchell through its regional affiliate, CDT

The Nine Network and its sister channels 9Gem and 9GO! transmit to Mitchell through its regional affiliate, IMP

The Special Broadcasting Service and its sister channels SBS Viceland, SBS World Movies, SBS Food and NITV also transmit to Mitchell.

Climate

Mitchell has a humid subtropical climate with hot summers and cold winters by Queensland standards. Mitchell has the largest overall temperature range recorded in Australia (56.2 °C, -9.4 °C to 46.8 °C). The town gets an average of 157.5 clear days annually.

Attractions
The Great Artesian Spa was opened in 1998 and is situated in the town's aquatic centre. There are two pools of artesian water, one heated and the other designed for those who prefer a cooler experience. Both spa pools have been designed with disabled access in mind and facilities include a chairlift to allow easy access for physically disabled people. The water used in the spa pools is renewed regularly and comes from the Great Artesian Basin, which is one of the largest artesian basins in the world, which underlies around one-fifth of Australia. It covers a total area of more than 1,711,000 square kilometres, and has been relied upon for the town water supply since 1927.

Other attractions include:
 Mitchell Yumba Interpretive Trail
 Neil Turner Weir
 The Kenniff Courthouse
 Kenniff Brothers Sculpture at Arrest Creek
 Major Mitchell's Campsite, 38 kilometres north of Mitchell
 Musical Cattle Grid, on the banks of the Maranoa River
There is a Visitor Information Centre located at the Great Artesian Spa complex, next door to the Mitchell Memorial Swimming Pool.

Notable people

 The 15th Prime Minister of Australia, Francis Forde was born in Mitchell. He is Australia's shortest serving Prime Minister, with a term lasting just eight days. He was also Australia's longest living Prime Minister, until Gough Whitlam took that mantle.
 Joanne Currie Nalingu, artist

See also

 Mungallala
 Muckadilla

References

External links

 
 
Mitchell Queensland – visitor information and website of the Booringa Action Group, a local not-for-profit organisation who supports the local community.

 
Towns in Queensland
Populated places established in 1864
Maranoa Region
Localities in Queensland